Abbasabad-e Sardar (also Romanized as Abbāsābād-e Sardār; also known as ‘Abbāsābād) is a village in Rigan Rural District, in the Central District of Rigan County, Kerman Province, Iran. At the 2006 census, its population was 2,324, in 527 families.

References 

Populated places in Rigan County